Brigadier General Edmund Godfrey Godfrey-Faussett (Kent 1869-), was a career soldier with the Royal Engineers, a vexillologist and official of The Boy Scouts Association.

Godfrey-Faussett was commissioned into the Royal Engineers as a second-lieutenant on 17 February 1888, was promoted to lieutenant on 17 February 1891, and to captain on 1 September 1898. He served in South Africa during the Second Boer War, attached to the Telegraph battalion, where he took part in the advance and Relief of Kimberley (October 1899 to February 1900), then served in the Orange Free State and the Transvaal Republic. Following the occupation of Transvaal, he was Director of Transvaal Telegraphs. For his services, he received the brevet rank of major on 29 November 1900. Following the end of the war in June 1902, he returned home with other men of his division on the SS Pinemore, arriving at Southampton in October that year to be posted at Aldershot.

He served with the original British Expeditionary Force in 1914 and earned the 1914 Star with Clasps and Roses, and retired in 1922.

Godfrey-Faussett, a personal friend of Robert Baden-Powell, became The Boy Scouts Association's Commissioner for training leaders.
He led The Boy Scouts Association contingent at the 4th World Scout Jamboree in Hungary. In the 1930s he wrote Flags: Their Design and Use. A Handbook For Scouts, Guides and Others. In the late 1940s and early 1950s, Kingsley C. Dassanaike worked to promote Scouting for the deaf and blind to Godfrey-Faussett.

References

External links

The Scout Association
Vexillologists
1869 births
Year of death missing